In Greek mythology, the name Saon (Ancient Greek: Σάων) may refer to:

Saon of Samothrace, also called Samon, son of either Zeus and an unnamed nymph (Nymphe) or of Hermes and Rhene. He was believed to have unified all the inhabitants of the island, who had previously lived in scattered settlements, into one people, which he further subdivided into five tribes named after his sons. He was also said to have established laws for the newly formed people.
Saon of Acraephnium, of whom the following story is related by Pausanias. When Boeotia was struck by a lasting drought, each of its cities sent delegates to Delphi to inquire of a possible remedy; the Pythia in her turn directed them to the oracle of Trophonius in Lebadea. The delegates could not find the oracle until Saon, the oldest of the Acraephnian envoys, noticed a swarm of bees and understood that he should follow it. At once he saw the bees flying into the ground, right where the oracle was.

Notes

References 

 Diodorus Siculus, The Library of History translated by Charles Henry Oldfather. Twelve volumes. Loeb Classical Library. Cambridge, Massachusetts: Harvard University Press; London: William Heinemann, Ltd. 1989. Vol. 3. Books 4.59–8. Online version at Bill Thayer's Web Site
 Diodorus Siculus, Bibliotheca Historica. Vol 1-2. Immanel Bekker. Ludwig Dindorf. Friedrich Vogel. in aedibus B. G. Teubneri. Leipzig. 1888-1890. Greek text available at the Perseus Digital Library.
 Dionysus of Halicarnassus, Roman Antiquities. English translation by Earnest Cary in the Loeb Classical Library, 7 volumes. Harvard University Press, 1937-1950. Online version at Bill Thayer's Web Site
Dionysius of Halicarnassus, Antiquitatum Romanarum quae supersunt, Vol I-IV. . Karl Jacoby. In Aedibus B.G. Teubneri. Leipzig. 1885. Greek text available at the Perseus Digital Library.
 Pausanias, Description of Greece with an English Translation by W.H.S. Jones, Litt.D., and H.A. Ormerod, M.A., in 4 Volumes. Cambridge, MA, Harvard University Press; London, William Heinemann Ltd. 1918. Online version at the Perseus Digital Library
 Pausanias, Graeciae Descriptio. 3 vols. Leipzig, Teubner. 1903.  Greek text available at the Perseus Digital Library.

Children of Zeus
Children of Hermes
Demigods in classical mythology
Boeotian characters in Greek mythology